Illinois wine refers to any wine that is made from grapes grown in the U.S. state of Illinois. In 2006, Shawnee Hills, in southern Illinois, was named the state's first American Viticultural Area.

History
Grapes have been growing in Illinois for over 150 years. One of the first areas to begin growing grapes was on the banks of the Mississippi in Nauvoo. The oldest recorded Concord vineyard in Illinois was planted in 1851 and is located in Nauvoo State Park; the vineyard is still producing fruit.

The oldest surviving family-owned vineyard in Illinois is also located in Nauvoo.  Emile Baxter came to Nauvoo in 1855 to join an Icarian commune and remained after the breakup of the group.  Learning about grape culture from his Icarian friends, Emile planted  of vineyards.  After Prohibition in 1936, the Baxter family winery became Illinois' first bonded winery.

In a sharply different region of Illinois, the Shawnee Hills, Guy Renzaglia founded Alto Vineyards in 1982. He planted new varieties such as Chancellor, Chambourcin, Vidal blanc, and Villard blanc.  Renzaglia and two other growers founded the Shawnee Hills Wine Trail in the 1990s.  As of 2004, 63 Illinois wineries, working with 193 grape arbors, produced 451,079 U.S. gallons (1.7 million liters) of wine annually with an annual total positive economic impact estimated at $20 million.

Winemaking expanded rapidly in Illinois from about 1990 onward.  The number of operating Illinois wineries increased in the state from 3 in 1985, to 12 in 1997, to 63 in 2004, and 79 in 2008.  In 2016, Southern Illinois University — Carbondale announced plans to create a degree-granting program in fermentation sciences, including winemaking.

Varieties
In 2004, twelve grape varieties accounted for 89% of grape area harvested in Illinois.  The favorite varieties, in descending order by area devoted to production, were Chardonel, Chambourcin, Vignoles, Traminette, Concord, Foch, Seyval, Norton, Vidal blanc, Frontenac, Niagara, and Cayuga White.
Many of these varieties are "hybrid" varieties.  These hybrids, which are adapted to the cold climates of central and northern Illinois, are grapes grown from vines that are hybridized descendants of both European vinifera grapes and native American grape varieties.  The Illinois Grape Growers and Vintners Association informed wine critics for the Wall Street Journal in 2008 that hybrid wines were the state's "strong suit."

American Viticultural Areas (AVAs)

Shawnee Hills AVA
One of the foremost grape-growing regions of Illinois is the Shawnee Hills, in Jackson County and Union County near Carbondale, Illinois in far southern Illinois.  This region was designated the Shawnee Hills AVA in December 2006, becoming the first American Viticultural Area within Illinois.  Besides the benefits of appellation recognition, this designation allows wineries to use the term “Estate Bottled” for wines produced on the same premises on which the grapes are grown.  As of 2006, the Shawnee Hills AVA included 15 wineries and 55 vineyards.  Jackson and Union Counties were the two foremost wine-producing counties in Illinois.

Characteristics that contributed to this decision are the lack of glaciation, as well as the bordering rivers. The heightened elevation (400 ft above neighboring land) in concert with sandstone and limestone subsoil offers satisfactory drainage, and summer breezes reduce fungal infestation.  The climate of the Shawnee Hills AVA, within the Illinois Ozarks region, resembles several areas in Missouri known for their wine (see Missouri wine).  The climate also resembles certain regions in Spain and Italy.

Upper Mississippi Valley AVA
The Upper Mississippi Valley AVA, which primarily covers Driftless Area regions in Minnesota, Iowa and Wisconsin, also covers the Galena region of Illinois.

Wine trails
As of 2009, there are four wine trails in Illinois.  Part of Illinois Route 127 south of Carbondale, which passes through the Shawnee Hills AVA, has been designated by the Illinois General Assembly as the Shawnee Hills Wine Trail.

The Northern Illinois Wine Trail passes through the Galena subdistrict of the Upper Mississippi Valley AVA.

The Illinois River Wine Trail centers on wineries in the upper drainage of the Illinois River, and the Heartland Rivers Wine Trail centers on wineries in and around the mouth of the same river.*

Categories
The Illinois State Fair, operated by the Illinois Department of Agriculture, recognizes ten distinct categories of Illinois wine:

 Dessert wine
 Fruit wine
 Generic blended wine
 Hybrid red
 Hybrid white
 Native American red
 Native American white
 Sparkling wine
 Vinifera red
 Vinifera white

In addition to grape-based wine, several wineries in the Illinois Ozarks ( part of the Ozarks ) and other regions of Illinois make fruit wine from apples, peaches, and berries.  Fruit wine is an officially recognized category within the Illinois wine industry.

Promotion
In addition to the Illinois State Fair, the Illinois wine industry has developed independent promotional pathways.  The first Chicago & Midwest Wine Show was scheduled to be held in Chicago in September 2008.

References

External links
Illinois Grape Growers and Vintners Association 
"Normal Daily Mean Temperature- Selected Cities"
"Shawnee Hills Wine Trail/History."
History of Wine in Southern Illinois (video)

 
Wine
Wine regions of the United States by state